Trichomycterus laucaensis is a species of pencil catfish endemic to Chile where it is found in the Lauca River basin.

References
 

laucaensis
Fish of South America
Freshwater fish of Chile
Taxonomy articles created by Polbot
Fish described in 1983
Endemic fauna of Chile